The Torture and castration of a Ukrainian POW in Pryvillia was an incident during the 2022 Russian invasion of Ukraine recorded on video and posted to Russian social media. It caused an international outcry and brought strong condemnation from a number of human rights bodies.

The emergence of the video
On July 28, 2022, a video was posted on a Russian Telegram page which showed a Russian soldier torturing and castrating a Ukrainian prisoner of war with a box cutter. The Ukrainian prisoner is bound and gagged. On the following day, an alleged continuation video was posted in Russian channels with possibly the same soldiers and the same prisoner. They taped the Ukrainian prisoner's mouth with black tape, placed his head in front of his cut genitals, and shot him in the head. After that, the Russian soldiers started grabbing the POW's corpse with ropes connected to his legs.

Bellingcat investigation
On 5 August, the Bellingcat group reported that the videos were geolocated to the Pryvillia Sanatorium, located in Pryvillia, Luhansk Oblast, and interviewed the apparent perpetrator by telephone. A white car marked with a Z – a designation marking Russian military vehicles and a militarist symbol used in Russian propaganda – can also be seen in the video; the same car can also be seen in earlier, official videos released by Russian channels, of the Akhmat fighters at the Azot plant during the Russian capture of Severodonetsk. Pryvillia had been captured and occupied by Russians since early July.

Bellingcat and Conflict Intelligence Team identified the soldiers involved, including the main perpetrator (an inhabitant of Tuva), who wore a distinctive wide brimmed black hat, as members of the Akhmat unit, a Chechen Kadyrovite paramilitary formation fighting for the Russians in the war in Ukraine. The investigation also indicated that the video contained no evidence of tampering or editing.

Reactions

In Ukraine
Ombudsman Dmytro Lubinets announced an application to the Office of the Prosecutor-General of Ukraine to verify a war crime according to the Geneva violation of the Geneva Convention, and that they would ask the UN Committee Against Torture to organize an urgent visit to Russia and Russian-occupied territories of Ukraine, as well as the Council of Europe's Committee for the Prevention of Torture.

International
The EU High Representative Josep Borrell released a statement on 29 July describing the contents of the video as "appalling" and a "heinous atrocity". On the same day, Marie Struthers, Amnesty International’s Director for Eastern Europe and Central Asia, said: “This horrific assault is yet another apparent example of complete disregard for human life and dignity in Ukraine committed by Russian forces. All those suspected of criminal responsibility must be investigated and, if there is sufficient admissible evidence, prosecuted in fair trials before ordinary civilian courts and without recourse to death penalty." The United Nations Human Rights Monitoring Mission in Ukraine released a statement on Facebook saying

See also
 Chechen involvement in the 2022 Russian invasion of Ukraine
 Makiivka surrender incident
 Torture of Russian soldiers in Mala Rohan
 Early 2023 execution of a Ukrainian prisoner of war

References

Castrated people
Deaths by person in Europe
War crimes during the 2022 Russian invasion of Ukraine